Jonathan Lopez may refer to:

Jonathan Lopez (singer), singer in the band C-Note
Jonathan Lopez (writer), American writer and art historian
Jonathan López (Argentine footballer) (born 1989), Argentine football forward
Jonathan López (Guatemalan footballer) (born 1988), Guatemalan football midfielder
Jonathan López (Spanish footballer) (born 1981), Spanish football goalkeeper